The Vishnukundina dynasty (IAST: Viṣṇukundina) was an Indian dynasty based in Deccan, which ruled modern Andhra Pradesh, Telangana, Odisha and parts of South India during the 5th and 6th centuries, carving land out from the Vakataka Empire. It played an important role in the history of the Deccan during the 5th and 6th centuries. The dynasty initially ruled from Indrapalanagara (in present day Nalgonda district of Telangana), and later shifted to Denduluru, and Amaravathi.

The area north of the Godavari, Kalinga became independent, the area south of the Krishna River fell to the Pallavas. The Vishnukundina reign came to an end with the conquest of the eastern Deccan by the Chalukya, Pulakeshin II. Pulakeshi appointed his brother Kubja Vishnuvardhana as viceroy to rule over the conquered lands. Eventually, Vishnuvardhana declared his independence and started the Eastern Chalukya dynasty.

Origin
"Vishnukundina" is a Sanskritised name for Vinukonda. The early rulers of the dynasty migrated from eastern deccan to the west deccan in search of employment and under the Vakatakas they might have attained feudatory status.

During the reign of Madhava Varma, they became independent and conquered coastal Andhra from the Salankayanas and established their capital at Denduluru near Eluru, West Godavari district.

Chronology
The Vishnukundina reign might be fixed between the end of the Salankayana and the rise of the Eastern Chalukyan power in 624. Some historians mention Vishnukundinas' reign was from 420 to 624, while some other historians say their reign was from the early 5th century to the 7th century.

Govinda Varma I

Govinda Varma I took the imperial title of Maharaja and his son Madhava Varma I was the founder of the power based on grants from Sriparvata (Nagarjunakonda) and Indrapalagutta.

Madhava Varma I 

The reign of Madhava Varma (c. 420 – c. 455). He was the founder of the Vishnukundina power.

Madhava Varma II 
Madhava Varma II, was the most powerful ruler of Vishnukundina dynasty. The reign of Madhava Varma II (c. 440 – c. 460) was a golden age in the history of the Vishnukundinas, he is regarded as the Greatest Ruler of Vishnukundina dynasty, the Vishnukundina dynasty reached its greatest territorial extent under Madhava Varma II. He defeated Prithvishena II, the powerful ruler og Vakataka dynasty, the daughter of Prithvishena II, Vakataka Mahadevi, was given in marriage to Madhava Varma II.

By the middle of the 5th century, the dynasty began its imperial expansion under its most efficient ruler Madhava Varma II, during this period, the small Vishnukundina dynasty rose to imperial heights. A princess of the then powerful ruling family of the Deccan the Vakatakas was given in marriage to Madhava Varma's son, Vikramendra Varma.

This alliance gave them great power and made it easy for them to extend their influence to the east coast and vanquishing the petty chieftains lingering on in that area. Madhava Varma II led his arms against Ananda Gotrikas who were ruling over Guntur, Tenali and Ongole, probably enjoying subordinate position under the Pallavas of Kanchipuram.

After occupying these areas from the Ananda Gotrikas, Madhava Varma II made Amarapura (modern Amaravati) his capital. Keeping in view the constant threat from the Pallavas, he created an out-post to check their activities and appointed his son, Deva Varma and after his death the grandson Madhava Varma III as its Viceroy.

Madhava Varma II next turned his attention against the Vengi kingdom which was under the Salankayanas. The Vengi region was annexed. The Godavari tract became part of the Vishnukundina territory. After these conquests the capital might have been shifted to Bezwada (Vijayawada), a more central location than Amarapura. These extensive conquests entitle him to the title of the lord of Dakshinapatha (southern country). After these various conquests Madhava Varma performed many Asvamedha, Rajasuya and other Vedic sacrifices.

Successors of Madhava Varma II 
The fortunes of the Vishnukundinas were at a low point during the reign of the next ruler Vikramendra Varma I (508–528). The next two and half decades also experienced the constant strife and dynastic struggles during the reign of Indra Bhattaraka Varma (528–555). Though Indra Bhattaraka could not withstand the hostile Kalinga subordinate, Indra Varma and lost his life in battle. The Vishnukundinas lost their Kalinga possessions north of the Godavari.

Vikramendra Varma II
With the accession of Vikramendra Varma II (555–569), the fortunes of the Vishnukundina family were restored. To have immediate access to the Kalinga region, he shifted his capital from Bezwada to Lenduluru (modem Denduluru in the West Godavari district). He repulsed the attack of the Pallava ruler Simhavarman. He was successful enough to restore the fortunes of the Vishnukundinas in the Kalinga region. His son Govinda Varma II enjoyed a comparatively short period of rule (569–573).

Janassraya Madhava Varma IV
The Vishnukundina empire set about again to imperial expansion and cultural prosperity under its able ruler Janassraya Madhava Varma IV (573-621). This prudent king spent his early years of rule in consolidating his position in Vengi. The later part of his reign is marked by wars and annexations. In his 37th regnal year, he suppressed the revolt of his subordinate chief the Durjaya Pruthvi Maharaja in Guddadivishya (modern Ramachandrapuram in the East Godavari district).

Madhava Varma IV had to face the Chalukyan onslaught in his last years of rule. By about 616, Pulakeshin II and his brother Kubja Vishnuvardhana conquered Vengi from the Vishnukundinas and the Pithapuram area from their subordinate Durjayas. In 621 in his 48th regnal year, Madhava crossed the Godavari probably to oust the Chalukyas from his territories. However, he lost his life on the battlefield. His son Manchana Bhattaraka also might have been expelled by the Chalukyas. Thus the Vishnukundina rule was brought to a close by 624.

Vishnukundina country
They had three important cities, Indrapalanagara, Denduluru, and Amaravati.

Administration

For administrative convenience, the empire was divided into a number of Rashtras and Vishayas. Inscriptions refer to Palki Rashtra, Karma Rashtra, Guddadi Vishaya, etc.

Madhava Varma III appointed members of the royal family as Viceroys for various areas of the kingdom.

The king was the highest court of appeal in the administrator of justice. The Vishnukundina rulers established various kinds of punishments for various crimes. They were known for their impartial judgment and high sense of justice.

Army
Their army consisted of traditional fourfold divisions:
Elephants
Chariots
Cavalry
Infantry

The Hastikosa was the officer-in-charge of elephant forces and the Virakosa was the officer-in-charge of land forces.
These officers issued even grants on behalf of the kings.

Taxes

There may have been well-organized administrative machinery for the collection of land revenue.
Agrahara villages enjoyed tax exemptions. Sixteen types of coins of the Vishnukundina rulers have been found by archaeologists.

Religion
All the records of the Vishnukundinas and the kings prior to the Madhava Varma II seem to be patrons of Hinduism.

From the time of the accession of Madhava Varma II, an aggressive self-assertion of the Vedic Brahmanism occurred. Elaborate Vedic ceremonies like Rajasuya, Sarvamedha, and Aswamedha were undertaken. The celebration of all these sacrifices represents the traditional spirit of the Brahmanical revival. Some of the rulers referred to themselves as 'Parama Mahesvaras'. The inscriptions refer to their family deity Sri Parvata Swami.

The names of rulers like Madhava Varma and Govinda Varma show their Vaishnavite leanings. Thus both the Hindu sects of Saivism and Vaishnavism might have received equal patronage from them.

Literature

The Vishnukundinas were also great patrons of learning. They established colleges for Vedic learning. Learned Brahmins were encouraged by gifts of lands and colleges were established for the propagation of Vedic studies. Indra Bhattaraka established many schools for imparting education on Vedic literature. The performance of several elaborate Vedic ceremonies by Madhava Varma is evidence of the faith of the rulers in Brahmanism and the popularity of Vedic learning with the people during this period.

Some of the Vishnukundina kings were credited with authorship of several books. Vikramendra Varma I was described as Mahakavi – a great poet in a record.  Further, an incomplete work on Sanskrit poetics called 'Janasraya Chando Vichiti' was attributed to Madhava Varma IV who bore the title of 'Janasraya'. Sanskrit enjoyed royal patronage.

Art and Architecture 
Being great devotees of Siva, the Vishnukundinas seem to have been responsible for the construction of a number of cave temples dedicated to Siva. The cave structures at Bezwada (Vijayawada), Mogalrajapuram, Undavalli caves, and Bhairavakonda were dated to this period. Though some of these cave temples were attributed to the Pallava Mahendra Varman I, the emblems found on the caves and the areas being under the rule of the Vishnukundinas during this period clearly show that these were contributions of the Vishnukundinas. The big four-storeyed cave at Undavalli and the 8 cave temples in Bhairavakonda in Nellore district show however clear resemblances with the architecture of Pallava Mahendra Varman's period.

See also

Vakataka
Salankayana
Eastern Chalukya
History of India

References

Bibliography

 Durga Prasad, History of the Andhras up to 1565 A. D., P. G. PUBLISHERS, GUNTUR (1988)
 South Indian Inscriptions 
 Nilakanta Sastri, K.A. (1955). A History of South India, OUP, New Delhi (Reprinted 2002).

External links 
 Map of find-spots of inscriptions issued by Vishnukundinas and other neighbouring dynasties
 

History of Andhra Pradesh
Dynasties of India
Ancient empires and kingdoms of India
Empires and kingdoms of India
Hindu dynasties
420 establishments
624 disestablishments